"Satellite" is a song by American rock group Dave Matthews Band. It was released in 1995 as the fifth and final single from their LP Under the Table and Dreaming. It reached #18 on the Modern Rock Tracks chart. The song originally debuted on their album Remember Two Things.  The guitar part for this song evolved from a finger exercise that Dave Matthews used to do.

Cover versions
Mika has recorded a version of this song as the B-side for the vinyl copy of the single "Grace Kelly", as well as an acoustic version exclusive to the Best Buy edition of his album Life in Cartoon Motion.
Josh Groban released his cover on the Deluxe Edition of his All That Echoes album, from 2013.

Track listing 

 "Satellite" (Radio Version) (Cold) — 4:14
 "Satellite" (Radio Version) (Fade) — 4:22
 "Satellite" (Album Version) — 4:50
 "Christmas Song" — 5:34

Charts

References 

1994 songs
1995 singles
Dave Matthews Band songs
Music videos directed by Wayne Isham
Rock ballads
Songs written by Dave Matthews
Song recordings produced by Steve Lillywhite